Lane Motor Museum is located in Nashville, Tennessee and features a collection of mostly European automobiles. The museum is a non-profit 501(c)(3) organization, founded by Jeff and Susan Lane, his father having founded the family's automotive extrusion business, L&L Products in Romeo, Mich. in 1958.

Museum

The museum was established in October 2002 by Jeff and Susan Lane, beginning with his personal collection of 70 vehicles in Nashville's former American Bread Company (1951-1994). The collection currently includes art, memorabilia and over 500 vehicles, with 150 cars displayed on any given day. The museum features European cars of unusual design, propeller-driven vehicles, microcars, three-wheeled cars, amphibious vehicles, alternative fuel vehicles, military vehicles, competition cars, one-off vehicles, prototypes — and 23 Tatras.

Since 2010 the museum has hosted an annual fundraiser where donors can drive a museum car on a nearby rural route.

References
6.  e2006 Hemings Feature Article from Hemmings Classic Car; November, 2006 -  Mark J. McCourt, https://www.hemmings.com/magazine/hcc/2006/11/Jeff-and-Susan-Lane/1366026.html

External links 
 

Museums in Nashville, Tennessee
Culture of Nashville, Tennessee
Automobile museums in Tennessee
Museums established in 2002
2002 establishments in Tennessee